Callum Garden (born 3 December 1999) is a Scottish cricketer. In June 2019, he was selected to represent Scotland A in their tour to Ireland to play the Ireland Wolves. He made his List A debut for Scotland A against the Ireland Wolves on 5 June 2019. He made his Twenty20 debut for Scotland A against the Ireland Wolves on 11 June 2019.

References

External links
 

1999 births
Living people
Scottish cricketers
Place of birth missing (living people)